This is a list of main career statistics of American professional tennis player Jack Sock. All statistics are according to the ATP World Tour and ITF website.

Performance timelines

Singles 
Current through the 2023 BNP Paribas Open.

Doubles

Mixed doubles

Significant finals

Grand Slams

Doubles: 3 (3 titles)

Mixed doubles: 1 (1 title)

Year-end championships

Doubles: 1 (1 title)

Masters tournaments

Singles: 1 (1 title)

Doubles: 10 (4 titles, 6 runner-ups)

Olympic Medal Matches

Doubles: 1 (1 Bronze)

Mixed doubles: 1 (1 Gold)

ATP career finals

Singles: 8 (4 titles, 4 runner-ups)

Doubles: 27 (17 titles, 10 runner-ups)

ATP Challenger and ITF Futures finals

Singles: 11 (6–5)

Doubles: 13 (3–10)

Junior Grand Slam finals

Singles: 1 (1 title)

National and international representation

Team competitions finals: 6 (2 titles, 4 runner-ups)

Team Tennis Leagues

League finals: 1 (1 championship)

*(HC): Head Coach, (F): Franchise Player, (W): Wildcard Player, (R): Roster Player, (S): Substitute Player

Record against top 10 players 

Sock's match record against players who have been ranked world No. 10 or higher, with those who are active in boldface.
Only ATP Tour main draw and Davis Cup matches are considered.
 Statistics correct .

Top 10 wins 
Sock has a  record against players who were, at the time the match was played, ranked in the top 10.

References

External links 

Sock, Jack